Livin is the seventh studio album by southern hip hop artist Young Bleed. It was released by his label Trap Door Entertainment on February 10, 2017. The album is his first solo release since his departure from Strange Music in 2011.

Background
Originally scheduled to be released on January 20, 2017, it was decided to release Livin at a later date, with the intent to extend the promotional efforts for the release. By doing so, Young Bleed was able to release a third single, "B' Dare", in addition to the singles "Livin' Good" and "On My Walter Payton" to support the release. The album features guest appearances by C-Bo, Big Mike, Spice 1, Yukmouth, Kokane, Daz Dillinger, Mo B. Dick and more.

Track listing

References

Young Bleed albums
2017 albums
Self-released albums